Trysimia andamanica is a species of beetle in the family Cerambycidae. It was described by Stephan von Breuning in 1948. It is known from the Andaman Islands.

References

Lamiini
Beetles described in 1948